Cornelia "Cox" Habbema (21 March 1944 – 18 April 2016) was a Dutch film and television actress. From 1968 to 1984, she played in films for the East-German filmproduction DEFA. She was married to the actor Eberhard Esche.

Selected filmography

To Grab the Ring (1968)
Eolomea (1972)
The Incorrigible Barbara (1977)
Apprehension (1982)
A Question of Silence (1982)

References

Bibliography
Goble, Alan. The Complete Index to Literary Sources in Film. Walter de Gruyter, 1999.

External links

1944 births
2016 deaths
Dutch film actresses
Dutch television actresses
Actresses from Amsterdam
20th-century Dutch actresses